Ann Matilda Forslund (born 9 November 1989) is a Swedish football midfielder, who most recently played for Hammarby IF in Division 1. She previously played for Sunnanå SK in the Damallsvenskan.

In October 2010 she was sanctioned for terminating unilaterally her contract with Sunnanå to sign for Spanish side Levante UD.

References

1989 births
Living people
Swedish women's footballers
Hammarby Fotboll (women) players
Damallsvenskan players
Sunnanå SK players
Women's association football midfielders